I'm So Proud is an album by American singer Deniece Williams which was released in 1983 on Columbia Records. The album reached No. 10 on the Billboard Top Soul Albums chart.

Singles
"Do What You Feel" reached No. 9 on the Billboard Hot Soul Songs chart. A cover of Curtis Mayfield's "I'm So Proud" reached No. 28 on the same chart.

Accolades
I'm So Proud earned a Grammy nomination for Best Female R&B Vocal Performance.

Track listing

Personnel 
 Deniece WillIams – lead vocals, backing vocals (6, 7)
 George Duke – electric piano (1, 4, 5, 8), synthesizers (1, 4, 5, 8), acoustic piano (5)
 Jerry Peters – keyboards (2, 6)
 George Merrill – synthesizers (2, 3, 6), backing vocals (2, 6)
 Brian Mann – keyboards (3)
 Tyrone Downie – keyboards (7)
 Michael Sembello – guitars (1, 5, 8)
 Jeff Baxter – guitars (2, 3, 6)
 Paul Jackson Jr. – guitars (2, 3, 6)
 Ronald Butler – guitars (7)
 Louis Johnson – bass (1, 4, 5, 8)
 Freddie Washington – bass (2, 3, 6)
 John "Shaun" Solomon – bass (7)
 Ricky Lawson – drums (1, 4, 5, 8)
 Denny Seiwell – drums (2, 3, 6), percussion (3)
 Errol Corwin – drums (7)
 Bob Zimmitti – percussion (2, 6)
 Paulinho da Costa – percussion (5, 8)
 Lenny Castro – percussion (6)
 Kenny Florendo – percussion (7)
 Larry McDonald – percussion (7)
 Ernie Watts – tenor saxophone (1)
 Lee Oskar – harmonica (2)
 Bill Neale – arrangements and conductor (2, 3, 6), backing vocals (2)
 Philip Bailey – backing vocals (2, 6)
 Carl Carwell – backing vocals (2, 6)
 Oren Waters – backing vocals (2, 6)
 Johnny Mathis – lead vocals (3)

Production 
 Larkin Arnold – executive producer 
 George Duke – producer (1, 4, 5, 8)
 Bill Neale – producer (2, 3, 6)
 Deniece WillIams – producer (2, 3, 6, 7)
 Peter Chaiken – engineer (1, 4, 5, 8)
 Tommy Vicari – recording (1, 4, 5, 8), mixing (1, 4, 5, 8)
 Don Murray – engineer (2, 3, 6), mixing (2, 3, 6)
 Kenny Florendo – engineer (7)
 Wally Traugott – mastering 
 Nancy Donald – design 
 Phillip Dixon – photography 
 Alan Mink – management 
 Myrna Williams – management

Studios
 Recorded at The Complex (Los Angeles, California); LeGonks West (West Hollywood, California); Sunset Sound (Hollywood, California); Monterey Sound Studios (Glendale, California).
 Mixed at Lion Share Recording Studios (Los Angeles, California); Sunset Sound.
 Mastered at Allen Zentz Mastering (San Clemente, California).

References

1983 albums
Deniece Williams albums
Albums produced by George Duke
Columbia Records albums